A black helicopter is a symbol related to conspiracy theories.

Black Helicopter or Black Helicopters may refer to:

Black Helicopter (band), a band in Massachusetts, USA
Black Helicopters, a band from Leeds, UK, members from which went on to form ¡Forward, Russia!
"Black Helicopters," a song by Non Phixion from the 2002 album The Future Is Now

See also

 
 
 
 Helicopter (disambiguation)
 Black (disambiguation)